Mehdi Hosseini (born 16 September 1993) is an Iranian professional footballer who plays as a central midfielder for Persian Gulf Pro League club Mes Rafsanjan.

Club career

Saba

Hosseini promoted to Saba first team in summer 2013 by Mohammad Mayeli Kohan. He made 10 appearances until fixture 13 but suspend after that for 2 years due Doping issues. He joined Saba again in summer 2015. He played against Saipa on October 27, 2015 4 days after end of his suspension while he used a substitute for Saman Aghazamani.

Career statistics

References

External links
 Mehdi Hosseini at IranLeague.ir

1993 births
Living people
People from Qom
Iranian footballers
Association football midfielders
Saba players
Aluminium Arak players
Mes Rafsanjan players
Persian Gulf Pro League players
Azadegan League players
Doping cases in association football
Iranian sportspeople in doping cases